Where U Been? may refer to:
Where U Been? (film), a 2010 stand up by Sinbad
"Where U Been?" (song), a 2013 song by 2 Chainz
Where You Been, a 1993 album by Dinosaur Jr.